The Montauban Challenger was a professional tennis tournament in France played on clay courts that was part of the ATP Challenger Series. It was held annually in Montauban from 1993 to 2007.

Past finals

Singles

Doubles

References
Official website of the International Tennis Federation

ATP Challenger Tour
Clay court tennis tournaments
Sport in Tarn-et-Garonne
Tennis tournaments in France